Hikmet Köksal (1932 – February 25, 2020) was a Turkish general, born in Yusufeli. He was the Commander of the Turkish Army during the 1997 "post-modern coup", and previously Commander of the First Army of Turkey (1994-1996). He was one of those arrested in 2012 as part of the investigation of the coup and of the associated West Study Group.

References 

1932 births
2020 deaths
Turkish Army generals
Commanders of the Turkish Land Forces